Huw van Steenis (born 27 September 1969) is a British financier and currently the Vice Chair at Oliver Wyman. He was formerly the Senior Adviser to the CEO at UBS. He also chairs UBS´ Sustainable Finance Committee.  

He formerly served as Senior Adviser to Mark Carney, the Governor of Bank of England where he led a review on the future of finance. Before, he was Global Head of Strategy at Schroders, a British multinational asset management company, and Global Coordinator Banks and Diversified Financials within the Equity Research Division at investment bank Morgan Stanley. He is noted for his bearish forecasts prior to the global financial crisis and Eurozone crisis, and views on the reshaping of the investment industry.

Education
Van Steenis was educated at Trinity College, Oxford where he obtained an MA in Politics, Philosophy and Economics. In 1994 he went to INSEAD Business School where he obtained an MBA.

Career
In 2004, he coined the term the "Asset Management Barbell", "which predicted the predicted the bulk of assets would be invested in low-cost passive or index-hugging products such as ETFs, with a small but significant amount in high margin" and "high alpha products, with intensifying pressure on the middle ground of more conventional asset management"

In 2012, he coined the term Balkanisation of Banking Markets to describe the breakdown in cross-border banking lending as regulators look to put up barriers to protect domestic markets and the policy challenge to rebuild a single market in lending within the Eurozone.

On 1 May 2018, Huw was appointed, by Bank of England Governor Mark Carney, to lead a review of the UK's financial system intended "to strengthen the Bank’s agenda, toolkit and capabilities". The Review was published 20 June 2019 alongside the Bank's response to the Governor's Annual Mansion House Speech. Recommendations included updating regulations for digital payments, considering opening up the Bank's balance sheet to new payment firms, a climate stress test for financial institutions and championing low carbon transition disclosures. They also included far greater use of technology by regulators and new policies for financials institutions to use technology to improve their resilience.

In 2020, van Steenis was appointed co-chair of the World Economic Forum's Global Future Council on Financial Services 2020-21. He has commented favourably on several UK government policy initiatives, including the UK housing scheme Help to Buy with his colleague Charles Goodhart.

In 2015, van Steenis joined the Board of English National Opera. In 2020, van Steenis was appointed to the University of Oxford Endowment Investment Committee. In 2023 he was appointed to the Climate Advisory Board of NBIM, the Norwegian Sovereign Wealth Fund.

Awards and recognition
In 2009, van Steenis was named 'European Banker of the Quarter' for Q1 2009 by The Wall Street Journal'''s Financial News for his work on the banking crisis and policy response. The judges describing him as "one of the most well regarded and influential voices commenting on issues facing the industry … who has helped to position the US bank as an authority on the European policy response to the crisis".
Anthony Hilton, City Editor, Evening Standard called him as "one of the most authoritative banking analysts in Europe"
His awards include being voted the number one equity research analyst for Banks and Diversified Financials twelve times in institutional investor polls.

He has won a number of forecasting awards including European "Stock Picker of the Year" for Banks and Financials in Reuter's Starmine twice.
In 2008, van Steenis was tipped as 'Rising Star Under 40' by Wall Street Journal's Financial News'' for the third time. The judges said: "He was early to spot the implications of the funding crisis and warned investors to steer clear of single-A banks, forecast the majority of the sectors rights issues and dividend cuts and the financials portfolio he runs for Morgan Stanley has outperformed the sector by over 25% for the year".

Personal life
Van Steenis is married to Camilla Cavendish, Baroness Cavendish of Little Venice. He is the great nephew of botanist Cornelis Gijsbert Gerrit Jan van Steenis.

References

1969 births
British bankers
Living people
English bankers
Alumni of Trinity College, Oxford
English people of Dutch descent
Morgan Stanley people
Spouses of life peers
Schroders people